Empiricism is the fifth studio album by Norwegian heavy metal band Borknagar. It is their first studio album to feature Vintersorg frontman Andreas Hedlund on vocals and Jan Erik "Tyr" Tiwaz on bass. It was also the last album to feature Jens F. Ryland on guitar until his return to the band in 2010.

The album was recorded at Fagerborg Studio and Toproom Studio during June and July 2001, and was mixed and produced by the band and Børge Finstad.

Track listing

Personnel

Borknagar
Andreas Hedlund (credited as "Vintersorg") – vocals
Øystein G. Brun – electric guitar
Jens Fredrik Ryland – electric guitar
Jan Erik Tiwaz (credited as "Tyr") – bass guitar
Lars A. Nedland – backing vocals, grand piano, synthesizer, Hammond organ
Asgeir Mickelson – drums, percussion

Production
Borknagar - production, mixing
Borge Finstad - production, mixing, engineer
Ola Johansen - mastering
Christophe Szpajdel – logo

References

External links
Borknagar-Empiricism (2001 5th Album at the Official Borknagar Website)
"Empiricism" at Discogs

Borknagar albums
2001 albums
Century Media Records albums